Ellen Rose Albertini Dow (November 16, 1913 – May 4, 2015) was an American film and television character actress and drama coach. She portrayed feisty old ladies and is best known as the rapping grandmother Rosie in The Wedding Singer (1998), performing "Rapper's Delight". Dow's other film roles include elderly lady Mary Cleary who "outs" her grandson in Wedding Crashers, Disco Dottie in 54, the recipient of Christopher Lloyd's character's slapstick in Radioland Murders and a choir nun in Sister Act. She was best known to small screen audiences for her guest appearances on sitcoms The Golden Girls (playing Lillian, a friend of Sophia's) and Will & Grace (as Karen Walker's mother-in-law Sylvia).

Early life
Albertini was born on November 16, 1913, in Mount Carmel, Pennsylvania, the seventh and youngest child of Italian immigrant parents, Ellen and Oliver, from Non Valley, Trentino. Oliver was a car dealership owner. She studied dance and piano at age five and would later move to New York City, where she studied and worked with renowned dancers and choreographers Hanya Holm and Martha Graham.

Secondary education
Dow earned a B.A. and M.A. in theatre from Cornell University, where she became a member of Kappa Delta sorority, graduating in 1935. Dow studied acting with Michael Shurtleff and Uta Hagen, and worked with mimes Marcel Marceau and Jacques Lecoq in NYC.

Career

Educator
When Dow moved to Los Angeles with her husband, she taught drama at Los Angeles City College. She and her husband later taught at Los Angeles Pierce College.

Acting
She founded the Albertini Mime Players and was its producer for 19 years. 

Her television work includes appearances in such television series as Star Trek: The Next Generation, The Golden Girls, Newhart, Designing Women, Just Shoot Me, Will & Grace, Seinfeld, Ned's Declassified, Hannah Montana, Scrubs, Sister, Sister, According to Jim, Six Feet Under, Wings, The Nanny and My Name Is Earl.

Personal life and death
Dow married Eugene Dow Jr. on June 27, 1951. She described herself as an avid hat collector. Eugene died on October 11, 2004. They had no children.

Dow died on May 4, 2015, at the age of 101 due to pneumonia.

Dow was a practicing Roman Catholic and a lifelong Democrat.

Filmography

Film

Television

See also
 List of centenarians (actors, filmmakers and entertainers)

References

External links
 
 
 Ellen Albertini Dow  at TV.com 
 

1913 births
2015 deaths
Actresses from Pennsylvania
American acting coaches
American centenarians
Cornell University alumni
American people of Italian descent
People from Mount Carmel, Pennsylvania
American film actresses
American television actresses
American voice actresses
American stage actresses
20th-century American actresses
21st-century American actresses
Women centenarians
Deaths from pneumonia in California
Pennsylvania Democrats
California Democrats
American Roman Catholics